Lozotaenia coniferana is a species of moth of the family Tortricidae. It is found in Japan on the islands of Hokkaido and Honshu and in Korea.

The wingspan is 20–25 mm. The forewings are pale greyish brown with blackish-brown markings and dark brown strigulation (fine streaks). The hindwings are grey brown. Adults are on wing in July in one generation per year.

The larvae feed on Abies sachalinensis, Abies homolepis, Abies concolor, Picea excelsa, Picea pungens and Picea alba. They feed on newly developing terminal growth, spinning the leaves. The larvae have a pale green body and blackish-brown head. They reach a length of 15 mm. The species overwinters as a young larva. Pupation takes place in the leaf shelter.

References

	

Moths described in 1961
Archipini